Prin Goonchorn (born July 21, 1995) is a Thai professional footballer who plays as a goalkeeper for Thai League 2 club Ayutthaya United.

Early career
Prin was born in Bangkok, but grew up in Chiang Mai. He attended Wachirawit School, where he joined the school's football team. He twice represented Chiang Mai for the Prime Minister Cup. After graduating secondary school from Rajavinit Bangkaepankhum School in Bangkok, he decided to pursue a professional football career and signed with Phayao F.C. in 2013, but spent two seasons as a second substitute goalkeeper.

Club career
He began making appearances in 2015, and became Phayao's primary goalkeeper. His appearances earned him a contract with Ratchaburi Mitr Phol in the Thai League (T1), but again as a second substitute. He made only one appearance for the team, in the Thai League Cup, where the team faced an upset loss 0–2 to Chanthaburi. He transferred back to Phayao for the 2017 season, but was released before the end of the first leg due to the club's financial difficulties. He briefly returned to university studies before being invited to try out for the local Thai League 4 team JL Chiangmai United, with which he signed a six-month contract. Beginning again as a second substitute goalkeeper, he eventually became a starting player toward the end of the 2017 season, which saw JL Chiangmai promoted, as well as entering the semi-finals in the FA Cup (losing 0–3 to Bangkok United). He became the only T4 player to be called up for the U-23 National Team for the M-150 Cup. He has signed with Thai League 2 team Thai Honda F.C. for the 2018 season. In 2022, playing for Ayutthaya United on loan, he scored an amazing goal from long distance in the first match of the season, kicking a free kick and surprising Kasetsart F.C.'s goalkeeper.

References

External links
 

1995 births
Living people
Prin Goonchorn
Prin Goonchorn
Association football goalkeepers
Prin Goonchorn
Prin Goonchorn
Prin Goonchorn
Prin Goonchorn
Prin Goonchorn